Lieutenant Colonel Duncan Maclachlan Carter-Campbell of Possil (8th of Possil) OBE (5 December 1911 – January 1990), son of Major-General George Tupper Campbell Carter-Campbell C.B., D.S.O, was a British Army Colonel during the 1950s.

Military career
Duncan Carter-Campbell was born on 5 December 1911 in Malta to General George Carter-Campbell and Frances Elizabeth Ward. He was educated at Malvern College, Worcestershire. He then entered RMC Sandhurst in 1930, and subsequently was commissioned into the Cameronians (Scottish Rifles) in 1932.

He served with the Regiment in India before the war in 1937-38 and was promoted to the rank of captain in January 1940 and major in November 1941.

In July 1943 he was appointed second in command of the 12th Battalion and on their disbandment was posted to the 1st Battalion in Italy and fought at the battles of Anzio and Monte Cassino. On 14 August 1944 he was promoted to Command the 1st Battalion where he fought in Nuremberg, Germany in 1945.

As a Staff Officer, he was then posted to the British Middle East Land Forces to support operations in Palestine/Transjordan between 1945 and 1947.

At the end of the second world war he served with the British Army of the Rhine from 1947 to 1948 under occupied Germany.

In 1952 he went on to command the Cameronians 1st Battalion and, for services in Malaysia, was Mentioned in Despatches on 21 October 1952. He also served in Bahrain and Trucial Oman.

In 1958 he became Secretary to the General Officer Commanding-in-Chief of Scottish command and Governor of Edinburgh Castle; Lieutenant-General Sir George Collingwood. He was the Director Royal Edinburgh Military Tattoo before retiring in 1962.

He was married to Margaret Elliot Davidson and had five children.  He died in Dumfriesshire, Scotland in January 1990. He, his wife and two of their children are buried in the churchyard at Kirkpatrick Irongray Church, Kirkcudbrightshire.

See also

Carter-Campbell of Possil
General Carter-Campbell
Cameronian

References

1911 births
1990 deaths
Officers of the Order of the British Empire
Cameronians officers
British Army personnel of World War II
People educated at Malvern College
Graduates of the Royal Military College, Sandhurst
Scottish soldiers
Scottish landowners
People from North Lanarkshire
Duncan
People from Penicuik
People from Midlothian
20th-century Scottish businesspeople